Safe in Hell is a 1931 American pre-Code thriller film directed by William A. Wellman and starring Dorothy Mackaill and Donald Cook, with featured performances by Morgan Wallace, Ralf Harolde, Nina Mae McKinney, Clarence Muse, and Noble Johnson. The screenplay by Joseph Jackson and Maude Fulton is based on a play by Houston Branch.

Plot
Gilda Karlson (Dorothy Mackaill) is a New Orleans prostitute. She is accused of murdering Piet Van Saal (Ralf Harolde), the man responsible for ending her former job as a secretary and leading her into prostitution. Her old boyfriend, sailor Carl Erickson (Donald Cook), smuggles her to safety to Tortuga, an island in the Caribbean from which she cannot be extradited. On the island, Gilda and Carl get "married" without a clergyman to officiate, and she swears to be faithful to him. After Carl leaves on his ship, Gilda finds herself to be the only white woman in a hotel full of international criminals, all of whom try to seduce her. Especially persistent is Mr. Bruno (Morgan Wallace), who describes himself as "the jailer and executioner of this island". He arranges to intercept letters Carl sends to her and steals the support money he includes. Bruno's intention is to make Gilda think Carl has abandoned her, hoping she will seek his assistance once she becomes desperate for cash.

Later, Gilda is astonished and relieved when Van Saal suddenly arrives on the island. It turns out that he had not been killed by her. He instead had feigned his death and enlisted his wife to collect on his $50,000 life-insurance policy. Once he had gotten the money, Van Saal abandoned his wife and then fled after she "squealed" to the authorities about his fraud. Bruno, now pretending to be concerned for Gilda's safety, gives her a pistol to protect herself. When Van Saal comes to her room and attempts to rape her, Gilda shoots and kills him. She is tried for murder and seems destined for acquittal by a sympathetic jury. While awaiting the official verdict, Bruno tells her that even if she is found innocent, he will arrest her for possessing the "deadly weapon" he had given to her. The sentence will be at least six months in his prison camp, where he will provide her with very comfortable living conditions, although she will be expected to give him sexual favors in return. To foil Bruno's trap, Gilda rushes back to the judge and gives a false confession of killing Van Saal "in cold blood", preferring to be executed rather than break her vow to Carl. The film ends with Gilda, followed by two policemen and Bruno, slowly walking to the gallows.

Cast

Cast notes
 Unusual in mainstream Hollywood productions of the time, the characters portrayed by the main African-American actors in Safe in Hell—Nina Mae McKinney and Clarence Muse—are almost the "only positive and reputable" figures in the film. The two minority actors also spoke in standard American English in the film, even though their lines had been written originally in "Negro dialect". William Wellman's biographer, Frank T. Thompson, speculated that either McKinney and Muse, who were popular favorites at the time, had enough clout with the studio to avoid using a racially stereotyped style of speaking or Wellman "just wanted to avoid a convenient cliche."
McKinney sings "When It's Sleepy Time Down South", written by Leon René, Otis René and Clarence Muse for the film.

Production
Filming of Safe in Hell began in mid-September 1931, under the working titles of Lady from New Orleans and Lost Lady, and was completed a month later, on October 18.

The production was originally scheduled to be directed by Michael Curtiz, and the casting of some male roles in the film initially included David Manners, Boris Karloff, John Harrington, Montague Love, and Richard Bennett. First National Pictures also considered Lilian Bond and Barbara Stanwyck for the part of Gilda.

Reception
At the time of its release, Safe in Hell was publicized as being "Not for Children". Time magazine gave the film a mixed review, commenting: "Safe in Hell is crude, trite, sporadically exciting." The Pittsburgh Post-Gazette derided the film as illogical and unintentionally humorous: "Miss Mackaill is too good for the likes of her role while the villains are acted with self-conscious bestiality and amusing indifference." It called McKinney's performance "the best thing in the picture." Variety found the film's storyline implausible as well and its overall tone excessively dark. In its review, Variety also noted that McKinney and Muse's performances provided the few bright spots in an otherwise "depressing" production:

Preservation
A copy of Safe in Hell is held in the Library of Congress collection. Warner Archive released it on DVD on November 8, 2011, and it occasionally airs on Turner Classic Movies.

See also
 Motion Picture Production Code

References

External links 

 
 
 
 
 South Seas Cinema website

1931 films
1931 drama films
American black-and-white films
1930s English-language films
Films about prostitution in the United States
American films based on plays
Films directed by William A. Wellman
Films set in New Orleans
Films set in the Caribbean
Films shot in New Orleans
First National Pictures films
Melodrama films
American thriller drama films
1930s thriller drama films
1930s American films